Kommunusamskipan Føroya (The Faroese Municipal Organization) is the organization of the greater municipalities of the Faroe Islands. The members are Tórshavn, Klaksvík, Runavík, Tvøroyri, Fuglafjørður, Vágur and Sandur.

External links
 KSF website 

Politics of the Faroe Islands